A honeymoon is a vacation taken by newlyweds immediately after their wedding, to celebrate their marriage. Today, honeymoons are often celebrated in destinations considered exotic or romantic. In a similar context, it may also refer to the phase in a couple's relationship - whether they are in matrimony or not - that exists before one becomes a burden to the other.

History

In Western culture and some westernized countries' cultures, the custom of a newlywed couple's going on a holiday together originated in early-19th-century Great Britain. Upper-class couples would take a "bridal tour", sometimes accompanied by friends or family, to visit relatives who had not been able to attend the wedding. The practice soon spread to the European continent and was known in France as a voyage à la façon anglaise (translation: English-style voyage), from the 1820s onwards.

Honeymoons in the modern sense—a pure holiday voyage undertaken by the couple—became widespread during the Belle Époque, in the late 1800s as one of the first instances of modern mass tourism.

According to some sources, the honeymoon is a relic of marriage by capture, based on the practice of the husband going into hiding with his wife to avoid reprisals from her relatives, with the intention that the woman would be pregnant by the end of the month.

Etymology
The honeymoon was originally the period following marriage, "characterized by love and happiness", as attested since 1546. The word may allude to "the idea that the first month of marriage is the sweetest".

According to a different version, of the Oxford English Dictionary:

Today, honeymoon has a positive meaning, but originally it may have referred to the inevitable waning of love like a phase of the moon. In 1552, Richard Huloet wrote:

In many modern languages, the word for a honeymoon is a calque (e.g.) or near-calque. Persian has a similar word, mah-e-asal, which translates to "month of honey" or "moon of honey".

A 19th-century theory claimed that the word alludes to "the custom of the higher order of the Teutones... to drink Mead, or Metheglin, a beverage made with honey, for thirty days after every wedding", but the theory has been challenged.

Effects
One 2015 scholarly study concluded that going on a honeymoon is associated with a somewhat lower risk of divorce, regardless of how much or little is spent on the honeymoon itself.  However, high spending and incurring significant debt on other wedding-related expenses, such as engagement rings and wedding ceremonies, is associated with a high risk of divorce.

Solomoon or unimoon
An emerging 21st-century travel trend is the "solomoon" or "unimoon", a separate, solo holiday the newlyweds take without their spouse. The New Zealand Herald cites a report by The New York Times that such alternatives to honeymoons are "particularly suited for couples who just cannot agree on where to go".  (This trend contrasts with the use by a jilted bride or groom of the travel reservations intended for the honeymoon, as popularly depicted in such films as Sex and the City: The Movie (2008), in which Carrie Bradshaw turns her ruined Mexican honeymoon into a girls' trip, and Like Father (2018), in which a bride left at the altar travels with her absentee father on the cruise meant for her honeymoon.)

See also 
Marriage leave
Vacation
Honeymoon rhinitis
Honeymoon cystitis

References

Wedding
Types of tourism
Types of travel